Lake Atoka Reservoir (also called Atoka Lake) is a reservoir in southeastern Oklahoma,  north of Atoka, Oklahoma, county seat of Atoka County, Oklahoma. It was built in 1959 to expand the water supply for Lake Stanley Draper in Oklahoma City and Atoka.

Description

Litigation over water rights
Atoka Lake is mentioned along with Sardis Lake, the Kiamichi Basin and the Clear Boggy Basin in a current court case (now known as Chickasaw v. Fallin), alleging that the state has violated the water rights of specific Native American tribes. The case was filed in 2011, and seeks to prevent of limit withdrawals of water from the named sources by the city of Oklahoma City and approved by the Oklahoma Water Resources Board.

Notes

References

External links 
Lake Information by Oklahoma City government

Protected areas of Atoka County, Oklahoma
Atoka Reservoir
Buildings and structures in Atoka County, Oklahoma
Bodies of water of Atoka County, Oklahoma
1959 establishments in Oklahoma